The Mid-Missouri Outlaws were a professional indoor football team which began play in 2006 and were a charter member of the Champions Professional Indoor Football League. Based in Sedalia, Missouri, the Outlaws played their home games at the Mathewson Exhibition Center at the Missouri State Fairgrounds.

History
The Outlaws joined the CPFL in 2006 as an expansion team before joining the American Professional Football League in 2010. The Outlaws played for three seasons in the APFL before joining the CPIFL for the 2013 season. The owners of the Outlaws were Chad Jackson, and Ethan and Trish Henson. The Outlaws played their home games at the Mathewson Exhibition Center in Sedalia. The Outlaws did not return to the CPIFL in 2014.

Final roster

Season-by-season

|-
| colspan="6" align="center" | Mid-Missouri Outlaws (CPFL)
|-
| 2006 || 2 || 1 || 0 || Exhibition season || N/A
|-
| 2007 || 8 || 1 || 0 || 1st, League || Won CPFL Championship (Missouri)
|-
| 2008 || 11 || 2 || 0 || 1st, East Division || Won Quarter-final (Topeka)Won Semi-final (Missouri)Won CPFL Championship (Independence)
|-
| 2009 || 12 || 0 || 0 || 1st, League || Won Semi-final (Missouri)Won CPFL Championship (Independence)
|-
| colspan="6" align="center" | Mid-Missouri Outlaws (APFL)
|-
| 2010 || 8 || 3 || 0 || 2nd, League || Won Semi-final (Springfield)Lost APFL Championship (Iowa)
|-
| 2011 || 4 || 6 || 0 || 3rd, League || Lost Semi-final (Iowa)
|-
| 2012 || 7 || 5 || 0 || 4th, League || Lost Semi-final (Sioux City)
|-
| colspan="6" align="center" | Mid-Missouri Outlaws (CPIFL)
|-
| 2013 || 0 || 12 || 0 || 10th, League || Failed To Make Playoffs
|-
!Totals || 59 || 33 || 0
|colspan="2"| (including playoffs)

2013
The Outlaws opened the 2013 season to a poor 0-3 record, with losses to Lincoln, Bloomington, and Salina. Their loss to Bloomington was a massive 51-point blowout, in which the Outlaws only scored 3 points.

Season Schedule

References

External links
Official website

American football teams in Missouri
Former Champions Professional Indoor Football League teams
American football teams established in 2006
American football teams disestablished in 2013